Gary Howard Price (born 28 October 1969) is an English former professional rugby league footballer who played in the 1980s, 1990s and 2000s, and coached in the 2000s.

Playing career

Wakefield Trinity
Price played , in Wakefield Trinity's 8–11 defeat by Castleford in the 1990–91 Yorkshire Cup Final during the 1990–91 season at Elland Road, Leeds on Sunday 23 September 1990, and played , and scored a try in the 29–16 victory over Sheffield Eagles in the 1992–93 Yorkshire Cup Final during the 1992–93 season at Elland Road, Leeds on Sunday 18 October 1992.

Featherstone Rovers
Price was signed by Featherstone Rovers in August 1993. During his time at the club, he was usually referred to as "Gary H. Price" to avoid confusion with another Gary Price who played for the club.

Price played , in Featherstone Rovers' 22–24 defeat by Wakefield Trinity in the 1998 First Division Grand Final at McAlpine Stadium, Huddersfield on 26 September 1998.

International honours
Gary Price won a cap for Great Britain while at Wakefield Trinity in 1991 as an interchange/substitute against Papua New Guinea.

References

External links
Wakefield v Bradford – in pictures
Late Brooker show breaks Salford
Woodsy on… Wakefield Trinity Wildcats
Price gets Rovers job
Rovers boss relishing Bulls clash
Featherstone 14–80 Bradford
Price prepares for charity cycle
Great Britain Rugby All Stars Squad
(archived by web.archive.org) Wakefield Trinity V Australia 1990
Three Charities benefit from Rugby League Tri athletes

1969 births
Living people
English rugby league coaches
English rugby league players
Featherstone Rovers coaches
Featherstone Rovers players
Great Britain national rugby league team players
Rugby league centres
Rugby league locks
Rugby league props
Rugby league second-rows
Rugby league wingers
South Sydney Rabbitohs players
Rugby league players from Wakefield
Wakefield Trinity captains
Wakefield Trinity players